Brigadier John Murray Rymer-Jones  (12 July 1897 – 17 December 1993) was a British Army and police officer.

Early life
Rymer-Jones was born in Blackheath, London, and educated at Felsted School and the Royal Military Academy, Woolwich.

Military career
Commissioned into the Royal Field Artillery in 1916, Rymer-Jones served in France and Flanders during the First World War, winning the Military Cross (MC) in 1917 and a bar in 1918, while serving with the 74th Field Brigade. The citation for his first MC reads:

"For conspicuous gallantry and devotion to duty. He went forward with the first wave of the infantry in an attack to the final objective, establishing signal stations at each objective as he went forward. He sent in early information as to the capture of the objectives and other valuable reports. He kept his lines working, continually going about repairing them under heavy fire, and sent in timely information of an enemy concentration for a counter-attack. He showed ceaseless energy and determination."

Rymer-Jones was promoted lieutenant in August 1917 and became an acting captain while serving as brigade adjutant from September 1918 until July 1919. In 1919 he served with the British Army of the Rhine and in 1920–1921 was in Ireland attached to the King's Own Royal Regiment. In 1921 he briefly served in Upper Silesia during the plebiscite and then went to Egypt as a staff officer until 1925. From 1927 to 1928 he served as a staff officer with the Shanghai Defence Force and his last years in the Army, from 1929 to 1933, were spent as a company commander at the Royal Military Academy. He was promoted captain in February 1929.

Police career
Following his retirement in February 1934 he joined the Metropolitan Police as a chief inspector and was posted to the headquarters of No.3 District in Hackney. He was promoted superintendent in May 1935 and took over the Croydon Division. In August 1936, he was transferred to the Organisation Department of the Commissioner's Office at Scotland Yard and in October 1936 was promoted chief constable. He was appointed Officer of the Order of the British Empire (OBE) in the 1943 New Year Honours.

In 1943, Rymer-Jones was posted to Palestine as Inspector-General of the Palestine Police, with the Army rank of brigadier. In 1946, he returned to the Metropolitan Police with the new rank of commander, taking over No.1 District (West End). He was appointed Commander of the Order of the British Empire (CBE) in the 1950 New Year Honours. In April 1950, he was appointed Assistant Commissioner "D" (Personnel and Training). He held this position until his retirement in August 1959. During this time he was a vocal advocate of police dogs and increased their use within the Metropolitan Police. He was awarded the Queen's Police Medal (QPM) in the 1959 Birthday Honours, two months before his retirement.

Later life
Rymer-Jones was also North Kent area commissioner of St John Ambulance from 1963 to 1966, secretary of the Drinking Fountain Association from 1959 to 1976, and on the committee of the Royal Humane Society from 1957 to 1977.

Footnotes

References
Biography, Who Was Who

External links
 Imperial War Museum interview
 Photographic portrait of Rymer-Jones in the National Portrait Gallery

1897 births
1993 deaths
People educated at Felsted School
Graduates of the Royal Military Academy, Woolwich
Royal Field Artillery officers
British Army personnel of World War I
Recipients of the Military Cross
Assistant Commissioners of Police of the Metropolis
British colonial police officers
Commanders of the Order of the British Empire
English recipients of the Queen's Police Medal
Metropolitan Police recipients of the Queen's Police Medal
People from Blackheath, London
Mandatory Palestine people of World War II